Daisy Hill Farm House is a historic building in Johnsonville, Wellington, New Zealand.

The house was built in about 1860 for Robert Bould, a pioneer farmer. He came to New Zealand with the New Zealand Company in the early 1840s and bought land for a sheep farm in Johnsonville in 1853.

Between the world wars, the sheep farm became a dairy farm, run by Hayes and later Martelli. The land supported nearly forty Jerseys, brindles and Ayrshires without extra crops for feed.

Built in a simplified Georgian style, it is one of the few remaining houses of this type in Wellington. The building is classified as a Category I ("places of special or outstanding historical or cultural heritage significance or value") historic place by the New Zealand Historic Places Trust.

References

Buildings and structures in Wellington City
Heritage New Zealand Category 1 historic places in the Wellington Region
Houses in New Zealand
1850s architecture in New Zealand